The Division of Laanecoorie was an Australian electoral division in the state of Victoria. It was located in the centre of the state, covering the towns of Creswick, Maldon and Maryborough, and later Castlemaine. It was named after the town of Laanecoorie.

The division was proclaimed in 1900, and was one of the original 65 divisions to be contested at the first federal election. It was abolished at the redistribution of 1 February 1913. It was held by one member, Carty Salmon, who was the second Speaker of the Australian House of Representatives from 1909 to 1910.

Members

Election results

1901 establishments in Australia
Constituencies established in 1901
Laanecoorie